Edward M. Augustus Jr. (born March 31, 1965 in Worcester) is an American politician and administrator who is the inaugural Chancellor of Dean College and served as the City Manager of Worcester, Massachusetts and was a member of the Massachusetts Senate.

Early life
Born at Worcester City Hospital to Edward Sr. (a machinist) and Dolores (a bank teller), Augustus graduated from St. John's High School in Shrewsbury, Massachusetts in 1983. He went on to Suffolk University, where he graduated with a Bachelor of Arts in Political Science, and then received a Master of Arts from Johns Hopkins University in Political Science.

Career
From 1989 to 1993, Augustus served as a member of the Worcester Public Schools School Committee.

After helping to elect Jim McGovern to the United States House of Representatives, Augustus worked in Washington D.C. as Chief of Staff for McGovern. From 2005 to 2009, Augustus represented the 2nd Worcester district in the Massachusetts Senate.

After leaving the state senate, Augustus served as executive director of the Children's Defense Fund of California. He left this position in 2010 to run McGovern's re-election campaign. After the election, Augustus became Director of Government and Community Relations at the College of the Holy Cross. On December 3, 2013, Augustus was named City Manager of Worcester, Massachusetts. Augustus took over as city manager in January 2014. He initially planned to serve for nine months, while on a leave of absence from the college, but accepted a three-year contract extension on September 30, 2014. On March 22, 2022, Augustus announced that he would be stepping down from his post as City Manager in May 2022. On June 1, 2022, Augustus was named the first Chancellor of Dean College.

References

External links
City of Worcester profile

1965 births
Living people
Politicians from Worcester, Massachusetts
Suffolk University alumni
Johns Hopkins University alumni
Massachusetts city managers
Democratic Party Massachusetts state senators